BOR may stand for:
Bill of resources
Biuro Ochrony Rządu, Polish Government Protection Bureau
Biology of Reproduction, a reproductive biology scientific journal
 БОР (Russian: Беспилотный Орбитальный Ракетоплан), a series of unmanned Soviet spaceplanes; see 
British other ranks
Bureau of Outdoor Recreation, a former agency of the U.S. Department of the Interior
Oranienburg station, Germany; DS100 station code BOR
Romanian Orthodox Church, Biserica Ortodoxă Română in Romanian
Scottish Borders, council area of Scotland, Chapman code

See also
Bor (disambiguation)